Evalyn is a given name. Notable people with the name include:

Evalyn France, the first woman president of a national bank
Evalyn Knapp (1906–1981), American film actress
Evalyn Parry, Canadian Quaker singer/songwriter and actress/playwright who grew up in Toronto, Ontario
Evalyn Walsh McLean (1886–1947), American mining heiress and socialite, the last private owner of the 45-carat (9.0 g) Hope Diamond

See also
 Eveline (given name)
 Evelyn (name)